Alexey Aleksandrovich Negodaylo (born 28 May 1989) is a Russian bobsledder who has competed since 2010.

Career
Negodaylo was part of a four-man Russian team who originally won gold at the 2014 Winter Olympics but was then disqualified and stripped of medals because Alexandr Zubkov tested positive for doping. On 27 November 2017, Negodaylo was found guilty in anti-doping rule violations, disqualified and declared ineligible for future Olympic games.

On 1 February 2018, the CAS removed the sanctions from Alexey Negodaylo and Dmitry Trunenkov in bobsleigh, but upheld them on their teammates Alexandr Zubkov and Alexey Voyevoda.

References

External links
 

1989 births
Living people
Russian male bobsledders
Bobsledders at the 2014 Winter Olympics
Olympic bobsledders of Russia
Competitors stripped of Winter Olympics medals
Russian sportspeople in doping cases
Doping cases in bobsleigh
Russian State University of Physical Education, Sport, Youth and Tourism alumni